The Ontario Research and Innovation Optical Network (ORION) is a high-speed optical research and education network in Ontario, Canada. It connects virtually all of Ontario's research and education institutions including every university, most colleges, several teaching hospitals, public research facilities and several school boards to one another and to the global grid of R&E networks using optical fibre.

History
ORION was founded in 2001 (then as The Optical Regional Advanced Network of Ontario, or ORANO) with the support of the Ontario Government. ORION is a self-sustaining not-for-profit organization kickstarted by the Ontario Government under Premier Harris.

ORION is owned and operated by a not-for-profit corporation governed by a Board of Directors, which includes representatives from the fields of education, research and business. ORION was initially funded by the Government of Ontario with additional funding from CANARIE, as well as private and public sector organizations and institutions. ORION is a self-sustaining organization, generating revenue from its connected institutions through user access fees and over network-based services.

Network 

The network spans  and connects 28 communities throughout Ontario. Almost 100 organizations and special projects connect to ORION directly, including 21 universities, 22 colleges, 34 school boards representing 2 million students, 13 teaching hospitals and medical research centres, and other research and educational and public library facilities. 

ORION connects to research and education networks elsewhere in Canada and internationally through the national CANARIE network, which exchanges with ORION at the Toronto Internet Exchange.

References

External links
 

Academic computer network organizations
2002 establishments in Ontario
Organizations based in Toronto
Organizations established in 2002
Science and technology in Canada